William Cowper can refer to

 William Cowper (1731–1800), English poet and hymnodist
 William Cowper (doctor) (1701–1767) English doctor and antiquarian
 William Cowper (anatomist) (1666–1709), English anatomist; eponym of Cowper's gland and Cowper's fluid
 William Couper (bishop) (1568–1619), Scottish bishop
 Sir William Cowper, 2nd Baronet, MP for Hertford, father of William Cowper, 1st Earl Cowper
 William Cowper, 1st Earl Cowper (c. 1665–1723), Lord Chancellor of England
 William Cowper (Archdeacon of Cumberland) (1778–1858), Anglican priest in Australia, father of the below
 William Cowper (Dean of Sydney) (1810–1902), Anglican priest in Australia, son of the above
 William Cowper-Temple, 1st Baron Mount Temple (1811–1888), British politician and courtier
 William Cowper (1853–1918), British stage and film actor

See also
 Cowper (surname)